The Nipe Formation is a geologic formation in Cuba. It preserves fossils dating back to the Paleogene period.

See also

 List of fossiliferous stratigraphic units in Cuba

References

External links 
 

Geologic formations of Cuba
Paleogene Cuba